Clonmines is a civil parish and townland in the Bannow Bay area of County Wexford, Ireland, the site of "the finest example in Ireland of a deserted medieval borough". It is situated in the barony of Shelburne, southwest of Wellingtonbridge on the northwest shore of Bannow Bay.

History
There is evidence of a Norse-Gaelic settlement in Bannow in general and Clonmines in particular. In the early thirteenth century, after the Norman conquest of Ireland, a borough and port was established at Clonmines by William Marshal. Colfer suggests that Marshal chose the site in spite of its shallow harbour and poor hinterland, to offer a sheltered winter port alternative to New Ross. After the partition of Marshal's Lordship of Leinster around 1249, Clonmines was a detached manor of the liberty of Kildare.

It was a notable town with a provost and bailiff in the fourteenth century, and still considered a town in the sixteenth. In 1552, king Edward VI funded a scheme to mine silver in nearby Barrystown, which was abandoned after five months. The name "Clonmines" predates these mines; its origin is uncertain. Herbert F. Hore in 1859 suggested the Irish Cluainmain "Ecclesiastical retreat on the plains".

Patrick Weston Joyce in 1913 suggested Cluain-mín "smooth meadow". T. C. Butler in 1986 suggested Cloch-Maighean, "a stone enclosure around the dwelling of a chief".

Colfer suggests that Clonmines' isolation from the rest of Kildare, and competition from New Ross, contributed to its decline. Sandbars had rendered the port unnavigable by the 17th century. The site was subsequently deserted, and no record exists of any charter. Clonmines Borough, like the nearby Bannow Borough, remained a rotten borough represented in the House of Commons of Ireland until the Act of Union 1800. Although Clonmines remains a civil parish, in 1785 the Church of Ireland parish was united by Walter Cope, Bishop of Ferns and Leighlin, with those of Tintern and Owenduff to form the Union of Owen Duff.

Ruins
A 1684 account describes the ruins of a church, an abbey, and "4 or 5 ruined Castles"; in the nineteenth century, "the seven castles of Clonmines" were still proverbial, although only some still had visible remains. Colfer in 2004 characterises the remains as two tower houses, one incorporated into a more modern dwelling; a fortified seventeenth-century house; the parish church of Saint Nicholas; another fortified church; and the Augustinian priory. The poorer people's buildings of wood and clay have disappeared. Excavations have revealed traces of the medieval defensive ramparts. The site is private property and not open to the public.

Sources

References

Civil parishes of County Wexford
Ghost towns in Europe
Medieval Ireland
Former boroughs in the Republic of Ireland